Herbert Harold Simpson (August 29, 1920 – January 7, 2015) was an American baseball player in the Negro leagues. He played for the Seattle Steelheads in the West Coast Negro Baseball League. He also played for the Birmingham Black Barons and the Chicago American Giants. In the Minor Leagues, he played for the Spokane Indians and the Albuquerque Dukes.

Simpson died in January 2015 in New Orleans. He was 94.

References

External links

1920 births
2015 deaths
Seattle Steelheads players
Birmingham Black Barons players
Chicago American Giants players
Spokane Indians players
Albuquerque Dukes players
People from Hahnville, Louisiana
20th-century African-American sportspeople
21st-century African-American people